The 1974 Australian Drivers' Championship was a CAMS sanctioned Australian motor racing title for drivers of Australian Formula 1 and Australian Formula 2 racing cars with the winner awarded the 1974 CAMS "Gold Star". It was the 18th Australian Drivers' Championship.

The championship was won by Max Stewart driving a Lola T330 Chevrolet.

Calendar
The championship was contested over six rounds:

Points system
Championship points were awarded on a 9-6-4-3-2-1 basis to the top six placegetters at each round. Only holders of a CAMS General Competition Licence were eligible, therefore any placings gained by international licence holders were ignored by CAMS when allocating championship points.

Championship standings

References

Further reading
 
 Jim Shepherd, A History of Australian Motor Sport, 1980, pages 67-68
 Racing Car News, December 1974, Sandown report, pages 38–40
 Racing Car News, December 1974, Oran Park AGP report, pages 60–61
 Racing Car News, January 1975, Phillip Island report, page 60

External links
 Australian Drivers' Championship records from www.camsmanual.com.au
 1974 Australian Drivers' Championship round results from www.oldracingcars.com

Australian Drivers' Championship
Drivers' Championship
Formula 5000